Robert Henri Alphonse McGee (born 1953 in Otter Lake, Quebec) is a poet who was active in the 1970s Montreal literary scene. He worked in construction at the Olympic Games site and was a member of the Heavy Equipment Operators Union. He has been included in compilations with the Montreal Vehicule Poets: 10 Poetry Readings: 10 Montreal Poets at the Cegeps (Delta, 1975) and Montreal English Poetry of the 70s (Vehicule Press, 1977).

Publications

Poetry

3 Dozen Sonnets & Fast Drawings. Montreal, QC: Vehicule Press, 1973.

References

1953 births
Canadian male poets
People from Outaouais
Writers from Quebec
Living people
20th-century Canadian poets
20th-century Canadian male writers